Marie-Pauline Soyer (Marie-Pauline de Saint-Yves Landon 26 April 1786 Caen - 30 January 1871 Paris) was a French engraver.

Life 
Pauline Landon was the daughter of Charles Paul Landon, and a student of François-Urbain Massard.

She contributed to Charles Paul Landon's Vies Et Œuvres Des Peintres Les Plus Célèbres De Toutes Les Ecoles in 1813, and Alexandre Laborde's Voyage de l'Espagne, published in 1818.

Her work is in the Collection of the Museum of Applied Arts, Vienna, National Gallery of Scotland. and Royal Collection.

She is the mother of the painter and engraver Paul-Constant Soyer (1823-1903).

References 

1786 births
French engravers
1871 deaths